Pradeep Kochar (born 6 May 1959) is an Indian former cricketer. He played first-class cricket for Assam and Delhi between 1980 and 1989.

See also
 List of Delhi cricketers

References

External links
 

1959 births
Living people
Indian cricketers
Assam cricketers
Delhi cricketers
Cricketers from Delhi